Hasan Ali Deh (also Romanized as Ḩasan ‘Alī Deh; also known as Ḩasan ‘Alī Deh-e Bālā and Ḩasan ‘Alī Deh-e Bālā Maḩalleh) is a village in Shirju Posht Rural District, Rudboneh District, Lahijan County, Gilan Province, Iran. At the 2006 census, its population was 750, in 248 families.

References 

Populated places in Lahijan County